William Hart Cairns (7 October 1914 – 1988) was an English footballer who played as a centre forward.

Cairns started his career with non-league Stargate Rovers before signing for Newcastle United in 1934. He scored a total of 53 goals in 90 league and cup appearances for Newcastle before the outbreak of World War II. Cairns signed for Gateshead in 1944, appearing in the 1945–46 FA Cup. He scored 5 goals in 4 games during the competition before signing for Grimsby Town prior to The Football League resuming in 1946–47. He played over 220 games for Grimsby before retiring in 1954.

Sources

1914 births
1988 deaths
English footballers
Association football forwards
Newcastle United F.C. players
Gateshead F.C. players
Grimsby Town F.C. players
English Football League players